Francisco Dávila García (born 2 April 1966) is a Mexican politician from the National Action Party. From 2006 to 2009 he served as Deputy of the LX Legislature of the Mexican Congress representing Aguascalientes.

References

1966 births
Living people
Politicians from Aguascalientes
National Action Party (Mexico) politicians
21st-century Mexican politicians
Members of the Congress of Aguascalientes
Autonomous University of Aguascalientes alumni
Deputies of the LX Legislature of Mexico
Members of the Chamber of Deputies (Mexico) for Aguascalientes